Ijeoma Umebinyuo 
is a Nigerian poet. She is considered one of Sub-Saharan Africa's best modern poets. She started writing at the age of seven and her short stories and poems have appeared in publications such as The Stockholm Review of Literature, The Rising Phoenix Review and The MacGuffin. Her TEDx talk was called "Dismantling The Culture of Silence". She has a book of poems called Questions for Ada and her work has been translated into many languages, including Turkish, Portuguese, Russian and French.

References

Nigerian women poets
21st-century Nigerian poets
Year of birth missing (living people)
Living people
21st-century Nigerian women writers